Avosnes is a commune in the Côte-d'Or department in the Bourgogne-Franche-Comté region of eastern France.

The inhabitants of the commune are known as Avosniens or Avosniennes.

Geography
Avosnes is located some 25 km west of Dijon and 10 km north-west of Sombernon. Access to the commune is by the D9 road which comes from Villy-en-Auxois in the north and passes down the eastern side of the commune south to Saint-Mesmin. Access to the village is by the D119F which goes west from the D9 in the commune passing through the village and continuing west to join the D119 north of Saffres. Apart from the village there is the hamlet of Barain in the north-west of the commune. There are large forests in the north of the commune with scattered forests elsewhere and the rest of the commune is farmland.

The Ozerain river flows from the south through the eastern side of the commune as it flows north to join the Brenne just south of Venarey-les-Laumes. The Ruisseau de Revillon rises in the centre of the commune and flows north to join the Ozerain at Chevannay.

Neighbouring communes and villages

Administration

List of Successive Mayors

Demography
In 2017 the commune had 89 inhabitants.

Culture and heritage

Civil heritage
The commune has one structure that is registered as an historical monument:
A former Chateau (16th century)

Religious heritage

The commune has one religious structure that is registered as an historical monument:
A Chapel and Cross at Barain (15th century) The Chapel contains many items that are registered as historical objects:
A Monument to the Memory of Mary of Brittany (1756)
A Retable: Resurrection of Christ (1756)
2 Retables (18th century)
A Baptismal font and Retable (1756)
A Statue: Virgin and child (15th century)
A Statue: Saint Antoine (16th century)
A Group Sculpture: Virgin of Pity (16th century)
A Bronze Bell (1788)
A Stoup (15th century)

See also
Communes of the Côte-d'Or department

References

External links
Avosnes on the old IGN website 
Avosnes on Géoportail, National Geographic Institute (IGN) website 
Avofne on the 1750 Cassini Map

Communes of Côte-d'Or